Yvonne Bonner (born 14 April 1987) is a Gaelic football and Australian rules football player. Bonner played her first ladies' Gaelic football match in 2002. She plays for the Donegal county team.  Bonner was recruited to play for the Greater Western Sydney Giants AFLW team in 2018. Bonner played her first AFLW game on 3 February 2019.

See also
 Irish experiment § AFLW

References

External links

 

1987 births
Living people
Donegal inter-county ladies' footballers
Ladies' Gaelic footballers who switched code
Greater Western Sydney Giants (AFLW) players
Irish expatriate sportspeople in Australia
Irish female players of Australian rules football